World Karate Championship in Weight Categories is the second largest competition in Kyokushin Karate. This tournament is arranged by several kyokushin organisations and usually held every fourth year in between World Tournaments which do not have any weight classes.

Rules 
All world cup tournaments operates under knockdown karate rules which involves standup bareknuckle fighting with basically no protection. The more characteristical rules in knockdown karate compered to other styles is that you are not allowed to punch in the face and a point system that only count hits that actually "hurt" the opponent. This makes knockdown fighting very physical but at the same time quite safe considering that there are very few hits to the head. There can be slight variances in the rules between the different organizations responsible for a tournaments but the basics are the same. The rules has also been modified over the years.

Normally knockdown rules includes 
 No protectors or guards are used, with exception to groin guards and teeth protection.
 3 minutes match-time
 The fighter that achieves an Ippon (one point) will win the match and the fight is stopped. An Ippon is achieved when an attack that knocks down the opponent for more than 3 seconds or renders the opponent being reluctant to continue the fight. An ippon can also be granted if an illegal technique is used and the other fighter is disqualified.
 A fighter can also win the fight by Waza-ari (half point) which is awarded if the opponent is knocks down by less than 3 seconds and is able to continue the fight. If two Waza-aris is achieved during the fight it is counted as an Ippon and the fight is stopped. 
 If no knockdowns occurs, the judges can declare one fighter as winner by overall efficiency of techniques, force and dynamics.  
 In case of a draw there can be up to 3 extensions (each 2 minutes long). Some tournaments will also settled draws by weight different and result of Tamaeshiwari (breaking of tiles)

Illegal techniques are 
 Punches to the face
 Kicks to the groin
 Grappling, grabbing of any form
 Headbutts
 Kick to knee
 Kick to rear of head
 Pushing
 Strike to spine from rear
 Elbow to face

Read more about various full contact karate rules

Before split of IKO 
Only world tournaments in open weight was organized by IKO (International Karate Organization Kyokushinkaikan) led by Sosai Masutatsu Oyama. After the death of Sosai, IKO was split in different fractions and several has since then started to organise world tournaments in weight categories from 1997 and onwards.

All Japan Weight Category Tournament 
IKO All Japan Weight Category Karate Championships is the annual Kyokushin Karate Japan Championship. It has been held in Osaka since 1984 and is held in four different weight classes. Exceptionally, the 2014 tournament was held in Tokyo. Earlier in 1969, the Japanese Championships were established, in which the championship is played in the open weight class. Between 1984 and 1996, there were three weight classes: light, medium and heavy. After the first World Weight Championships in 1997, the weight classes were increased by one.

Super Heavyweight (+85 kg)

Heavyweight (-85 kg)

Middleweight (-75 kg)

Lightweight (-65 kg)

U.S. Weight Category Karate Championships (USWC)  
The Kyokushin U.S. Weight Category Karate Championships (USWC) is the annual Kyokushin Karate U.S. Championship. It has been held in Los Angeles since 2005 and is held in four different weight classes. Previously, the All American Open was held in 1996, where the championship is played in the open weight class. In the first year, there were three weight classes.

Super Heavyweight (+90 kg)

Heavyweight (-90 kg)

Middleweight (-80 kg)

Lightweight (-70 kg)

European Weight Category Karate Championships 
The Kyokushin European Weight Category Karate Championships is the annual Kyokushin Karate European Championship. It has been organized since 1978 and is held in four different weight classes. The first European Championships in 1978 were known as the European Championships in London. After Oyama's death in 1994, the Kyokushi organization disbanded into several other organizations. The original IKO1 organization continued the European Championships under a new name in 1996. Between 1978 and 1996, there were mainly three weight classes, the light series (less than 70 kg), the middle series (less than 80 kg) and the heavy series (more than 80 kg). Exceptionally, the first European Championships had only two weight classes.

Super Heavyweight (+90 kg)

 The weight limit for the super heavyweight series in 1982 was over 85 kg

Heavyweight (-90 kg)
 Years 1978–1995 heavyweight weight limit was +80 kg. 
 The weight limit for the heavy series in 1982 was 76–85 kg

Middleweight (-80 kg)
 The weight limit for the middle series in 1982 was 68–76 kg

Lightweight (-70 kg)
 The weight limit for the lightweight series in 1982 was 68 kg

Featherweight (-60 kg)

IKO1 (Matsui branch) 
From 1997, the World cup in weight categories has been organized by IKO1 led by Shokei Matsui.  
 1st World cup in weight categories IKO1 (1997, Osaka, Japan) 
 2nd World cup in weight categories IKO1 (10 June 2001, Osaka, Japan) 
 3rd World cup in weight categories IKO1 (1 May 2005, Tokyo, Japan) 
 4th World cup in weight categories IKO1 (23 August 2009, Tokyo-Chiba, Japan) 
 5th World cup in weight categories IKO1 (28 April 2013, Tokyo, Japan) 
 6th World cup in weight categories IKO1 (16 April 2017, Tokyo, Japan)

Super Heavyweight (+90 kg)

Heavyweight (-90 kg)

Middleweight (-80 kg)

Lightweight (-70 kg)

WKO (Shinkyokushinkai) 
From 1997, the World cup in weight categories has been organized by WKO (World Karate Organization Shinkyokushinkai) led by Kenji Midori.  
 1st World cup in weight categories WKO (1997, Chiba, Japan) 
 2nd World cup in weight categories WKO (23 June 2001, Budapest, Hungary) 
 3rd World cup in weight categories WKO (18-19 June 2005, Osaka, Japan) 
 4th World cup in weight categories WKO (20-21 June 2009, St. Petersburg, Russia) 
 5th World cup in weight categories WKO (13-14 April 2013, Vilnius, Lithuania) 
 6th World cup in weight categories WKO (1-2 July 2017, Astana City, Kazakhstan) 
Results to be added

IKO3 (Matsushima branch) 
From 2002, the World Open Tournament has also been organized by IKO3 led by Yoshikazu Matsushima.  
 1st World cup in weight categories IKO3 (June 2002, Maine, USA) 
 2nd World cup in weight categories IKO3 (4 - 5 November 2006, Sydney, Australia) 
 3rd World cup in weight categories IKO3 (19-20 June 2010, Malaga, Spain) 
 4th World cup in weight categories IKO3 (6-7 September 2014, Durban, South Africa) 
 5th World cup in weight categories IKO3 (17-18 November 2018, Shanghai China) 
Results to be added

Kyokushin Union (Rengokai) 
From 2009, the World Open Tournament has also been organized by All Japan Kyokushin Union (Kyokushin Rengōkai) led by Yasuhiro Shichinohe. 
 1st World cup in weight categories Rengokai (28 June 2009, Japan) 
 2nd World cup in weight categories Rengokai (6 July 2011, Japan) 
 3rd World cup in weight categories Rengokai (?) 
 4th World cup in weight categories Rengokai (24 October 2015, Schweinfurt, Germany) 
 5th World cup in weight categories Rengokai (12-13 November 2017, Jakarta, Indonesia) 
 6th World cup in weight categories Rengokai (5 -6 October 2019, Moscow, Russia) 
Results to be added

Kyokushin-kan (Royama branch) 
Results to be added

So-Kyokushin (Ohishi branch) 
Results to be added

IFK 
Results to be added

KWF 
Results to be added

Ibutz Oyama Cup 
The Ibutz Oyama Cup was a Kyokushin karate tournament held in Hungary. It was held three times between 1983 and 1986 at the National Sports Arena in Budapest. The tournament was held in three different weight classes. Kyokushin founder Masutatsu Ōyama first visited Hungary in 1983 and was also involved in overseeing the next two tournaments.

Heavyweight (+80 kg)

Middleweight (-80 kg)

Lightweight (-70 kg)

See also 
 Kyokushin World Tournament Open

References 

Karate competitions in Japan